KOMX (100.3 FM) is a radio station broadcasting a country music format. Licensed to Pampa, Texas, United States, it serves the northeastern portion of the Amarillo area due to interference of KNNK at 100.5 from the southwestern area.  The station is currently owned by Southwest Media Group - Pampa LLC.

External links

Country radio stations in the United States
OMX
Radio stations established in 1981
1981 establishments in Texas